Kunal Singh (29 September 1976 – 7 February 2008), known professionally as Kunal, was an Indian actor who mainly appeared in Tamil films. He is best known for his romantic role in Kathir's Kadhalar Dhinam (1999), which is Kunal's debut super-hit film.

Career 
Kunal was born on 1976 in Haryana, India. He was introduced in Kathir's 1999 romantic Tamil film Kadhalar Dhinam, alongside Sonali Bendre, a popular Bollywood actress that time. He played a young student who falls in love with Bendre's character over the internet. After the relative success of Kadhalar Dhinam, Kunal appeared in a series of Tamil films like Paarvai Ondre Pothume (2001) and Punnagai Desam (2002). Those films were relatively successful.

Then, he appeared in many flops like Pesadha Kannum Pesume, Enge Enadhu Kavithai and Unarchigal. Several of his later films were started and then shelved, like Nava's Nilavinilae opposite Vijayalakshmi, Kimu Kipi opposite Susan, and Rithik's Kadhalithal Anandam, which would have featured him alongside Livingston and Kausalya. Moreover, two films which he had signed opposite actress Sherin Shringar, Jai Adithya's Kadhal Thiruda and Nanda's Thodu, were shot and unreleased.

When he was unable to find roles as an actor, he served as assistant editor for several films and turned to producing. His last film release in Tamil was Nanbanin Kadhali, which released in 2007.

Death 
On 7 February 2008, Kunal was found hanging from the ceiling in his Mumbai apartment by actress Lavina Bhatia. The apparent suicide was challenged by his father Rajendra Singh who claimed that the body showed signs of suspicious bruising. Bhatia was detained by police in connection with his death, but she was later released after the police could not prove a motive. The police were unable to prove that anyone was present in Kunal's apartment at the time of his death and ruled out Bhatia as a suspect; furthermore, Kunal had attempted suicide by slashing his wrists several months earlier. At the time of his death, Kunal was working on a Hindi film, Yogi, which was being produced by his newly formed production company Balagiri. The case was referred to CBI and Prof T D Dogra of All India Institute of Medical Sciences. He examined the scene of crime along with CBI and opined in favor of suicide.

Filmography 

All films are in Tamil, unless otherwise noted.

References

External links 
 

Indian male film actors
1976 births
2008 deaths
Male actors from Haryana
Male actors in Tamil cinema
Suicides by hanging in India
Tamil actors
2008 suicides
Artists who committed suicide